Donald Hoffman may refer to:

 Donald J. Hoffman (born 1952), American general
 Donald D. Hoffman (born 1955), American cognitive scientist and popular science author
 Don Hoffman, American children's author